The Islamic Azad University, Tehran Medical Branch (Danushgah-e Âzad-e Eslâmi-ye Vahed-e Pezeshki-ye Tehran) is a private medical university located in Tehran, Iran. This university is a branch of the Islamic Azad University.

History
Islamic Azad University, Tehran Medical Branch was established on June 17, 1985. The University is a non-governmental (ONG) and the non-profit organization for the public utility; its budget is provided by the student inscription fees. The University began its activities under the presidency of Dr. Seyed Hossein Yahyavi and commissioning of four educational levels of the professional doctorate in medicine, nursing, midwifery and laboratory sciences in bachelor level with the absorption of 376 students and now with over 6000 students has three approval school, 17 branches in educational levels of a professional doctorate, master, bachelor of science, discontinued bachelor and associate degree.

From March 2007, Dr. Ahmad Firouzan has been president, and the university continued to attract more faculty members, activate Educational Development Center (EDC), establishment and commissioning of new fields, equipping hospitals, Construction of modern subspecialty hospitals with 240 beds on Bou-Ali hospital in current land hospital, set up research centers and follow-up cultural issues are the different subjects which were already considerable in Tehran Medical Branch.

In 2017, the leading committee of Islamic Azad University decided on the amalgamation of Medical, Dentistry, and Pharmaceutical branches, forming one of the biggest branches of medical and clinical sciences of Islamic Azad University. Following the merge, Dentistry, Pharmaceutical, and Medical Sciences are working and collaborating under the same umbrella, Islamic Azad University of Medical Sciences.

Faculties and schools 
Academic life at this university is organised into 8 faculties:

 Faculty of Pharmacy and Pharmaceutical Sciences
 Faculty of Medicine
 Faculty of Dentistry
 Faculty of Advanced Sciences and Technology
 Faculty of Pharmaceutical Chemistry
 Faculty of Nursing and Midwifery
 Faculty of Health and Medical Engineering and Psychology
 Faculty of Paramedic

Faculty members
Almost 2500 officially full-time faculty members collaborate in this University. Close to 80% of them have Ph.D. and subspecialty degree with the academic rank of Professor, Associate and Assistant Professor.

Number of graduates
The total number of Tehran Medical Branches’ graduates till September 2007, was around eleven thousand individual, 3700 of them graduates in associate degrees, 3210 in bachelor level, 370 individuals in discontinued bachelor level, 200 graduates in master's degree and 3500 graduates in a professional doctorate.

Educational and research activities
 The university has been engaging in research for students and faculty members. Among these measures are several patents by faculty members and students, publishing dozens of articles in scientific journals and prestigious domestic and international ISI, equipping and commissioning of Internet library which allows access to the latest medical journals and magazines. Now in this University four library, with over 39 thousand volumes of reference and unreferenced Persian and Latin books.

Sport Activities
Another feature of Tehran Medical Branch is the athlete's brilliance and earning top grades in different Olympiads. Student-athletes of this university, in the seventh sportive and cultural Olympiad of the medical sciences, earned first place in the field of badminton, tennis, and taekwondo.

The Head of the physical education department of Tehran Medical Branch is in charge of the vice president and member of the Board of Administrators Ladies Football Federation of the Islamic Republic of Iran.

The total area of development space
Tehran Medical Branch is over 116 thousand square meters, about 6500 square meters is allocated to the student welfare centers including 600 meters square of gym area, the library area is about 800 square meters, green space and parking area nearly 5000 square meters.

References

External links 
 official website
 official website in English

Universities in Tehran
Medical Branch of Tehran
Medical schools in Iran
1985 establishments in Iran